The Lake of Ghosts (Mamraz Lake) is a small lake situated in the richly-forested Iranian province of Mazandaran, and located  from the city of Nowshahr. The settlement nearest the lake is the village of Vanush. The local name for this lake is Mamraz (meaning hornbeam in Persian), but it is better known by the names "Ghost Lake" or "Lake of Ghosts" - given it in reference to its eerie swampland landscape featuring countless half-drowned trees, often shrouded in mist, giving them the appearance of phantoms.

Natural history 
'The Lake of Ghosts' or 'Hornbeam Lake' has long been regarded as a site of natural beauty by virtue not only of its geographical location, but also of a flora rich in plant species, both woody and herbaceous. This lake has been registered in the Cultural Heritage, Handicrafts and Tourism Organization of Iran by the registered number of 402 in order to preserve its animal and plant species. The formation of the lake took place over a geological timespan extending from the middle Cretaceous to the  Quaternary period.

The dead or moribund specimens protruding from the lake have suffered considerable decay from having been partially submerged in its waters for many years. Unlike the hornbeams, the alders are well-adapted to the wetland habitat of the lake and are thus in better health.

For all its strange beauty, the Lake of Ghosts has not yet been promoted seriously as a tourist attraction and, as yet, lacks any facilities which could make it such. It can be accessed only on rough roads requiring the use of four-wheel drive vehicles - and even then only safely at certain times of year.

Media and related videos 
Films and documentaries on the lake have been made or are being produced. One of these is named The Lake of Ghosts by Reza Jafari Jozani with Dr. Hesam Bani-Eghbal. Works of fiction inspired by the lake may include a novel of the same name written by Darren Shan, under the name of 'The Lake of Souls'.

Gallery

See also 

 Ghost Lake, Alberta
 Ghost Lake
 The Lake of Souls

References 

Tourist attractions in Iran
Lakes of Iran
Protected areas of Iran
Biosphere reserves of Iran
 
Alborz (mountain range)